Savannah-Chatham County Public School System (SCCPSS) is a school district based in Chatham County, Georgia, United States. SCCPSS is run by an elected Board of Public Education and operates most public schools in the Chatham County, including those in the city of Savannah. It is the sole school district in the county. The current superintendent is Dr. M. Ann Levett

The system has an enrollment of over 38,100 students and operates 23 elementary schools, eight middle schools, eight K-8 schools, 11 high schools, and satellite facilities including the Massie Heritage Interpretation Center (a preserved historic school) and the Oatland Island Education Center (an environmental education complex). The school system supports two alternative schools for middle and/or high school students and an adult learning center.

Administration

Board of Public Education

The Savannah Chatham County Public School Board is the elected policy-making branch of the school district's administration. Eight board members, each representing a geographic district that coincides with those of the Chatham County Commission, are elected to a four-year term. The board president is elected county-wide for a four-year term.

Superintendent
The superintendent of schools is appointed by the Savannah Chatham County Board of Education and is charged with implementing the board's policies and the overall administration of the school system. Dr. M. Ann Levett was hired as superintendent by a controversial 5:4 split vote in June 2017.

Schools

Elementary schools
Bloomingdale Elementary School
Brock Elementary School
Butler Elementary School
Gadsden Elementary School
Garden City Elementary School
Gould Elementary School
Haven Elementary School
Heard Elementary School
Hodge Elementary School
Howard Elementary School
Largo-Tibet Elementary School
Juliette Low Elementary School
Marshpoint Elementary School
Pooler Elementary School
Port Wentworth Elementary School
Pulaski Elementary School
Rice Creek School
Savannah Classical Academy (Charter School)
J.G. Smith Elementary School
Shuman Elementary School
Southwest Elementary School
Andrea B. Williams Elementary School
Susie King Taylor Community School (Charter School)
Thunderbolt Elementary School
Tybee Maritime Academy (Charter School)
West Chatham Elementary School
White Bluff Elementary School
Windsor Forest Elementary School

Middle schools
STEM at Bartlett Middle School
Coastal Middle School
DeRenne Middle School
Hubert Middle School
Mercer Middle School
Myers Middle School
Oglethorpe Charter Middle School
Southwest Middle School
West Chatham Middle School

K-8 schools
East Broad 
Ellis Montessori
Esther F. Garrison
Georgetown
Godley Station
Hesse
Isle of Hope
New Hampstead K-8

High schools
Alfred E. Beach High School
Robert W. Groves High School
Islands High School
Herschel V. Jenkins High School
Sol C. Johnson High School
New Hampstead High School
Savannah Arts Academy
Savannah High School
Savannah Early College High School
Windsor Forest High School
Woodville Tompkins Technical & Career High School

Charter schools
Coastal Empire Montessori
Oglethorpe Charter School
Savannah Classical Academy
Tybee Island Maritime Academy

Former schools
Richard Arnold High School
Commercial High School
Islands Elementary School
Shuman Middle School
Tompkins High School
Scott Middle School

Notes
A. List information from 
B. List information from  
C. List information from 
D. List information from 
E. List information from

References

External links

School districts in Georgia (U.S. state)
Education in Savannah, Georgia
Education in Chatham County, Georgia